Andries Vierlingh (1507–1579) was a dyke builder and polder creator in the Netherlands who drew considerable attention to himself.

By 1540 he had already reclaimed some 4000 hectares of new land. This gave investors ideas; they could see a bright future and money to be made in territorial expansion. William of Orange was to be one of them.

Shortly before he died Vierlingh published a manuscript entitled Tractaet Dyckagie which is still valid as a warning against fundamental errors in land and water engineering management.

Sources and further reading
, Tractaet van Dyckagie. Waterbouwkundige adviezen en ervaringen van Andries Vierlingh. (in Dutch) Rijks Geschiedkundige Publicatiën [RGP], kleine serie 20 [boek] en 20a [14 platen, losbladig in een map], 's-Gravenhage, 1920 [heruitgave door de Nederlandse Vereniging van Kust- en Oeverwerken, Rotterdam, 1973]

External links
https://web.archive.org/web/20131105105306/http://watercanon.nederlandleeftmetwater.nl/view/canon/professionalisation

1507 births
1579 deaths
Dutch engineers